The 1972–73 Cypriot First Division was the 34th season of the Cypriot top-level football league.

Overview
It was contested by 14 teams, and APOEL F.C. won the championship.  AC Omonia participated in the Greek championship as the previous year's champions. They finished in 18th position.

League standings

Results

References
Cyprus - List of final tables (RSSSF)

Cypriot First Division seasons
Cypriot First Division, 1972-73
1